The Wind Is Strong... is a 1990 album from Cindytalk. It was released by Midnight Music.

From the sleeve notes: "A Cindytalk diversion: Originally recorded as a soundtrack for the film Eclipse." Eclipse has never been officially released. It was directed by Ivan Unwin, a U.K.-based film-maker who had previously collaborated with Cindytalk on several short films.

Track listing CD
 Landing
 Firstsight
 To the Room
 Waiting
 Through Flowers
 Secondsight
 Through the Forest
 Arrival
 Is There a Room for Hire
 Choked I
 Choked II
 Dream Ritual
 Fuck You Mrs. Grimace
 On Snowmoor
 Angel Wings

Personnel
Gordon Sharp
Ivan Unwin
Matthew Kinnison
Paul Middleton

Versions
 LP 1990 Midnight Music, Cat# CHIME CHIME 01.03 S
 CD 1990 Midnight Music, Cat# CHIME 01.03 CD

References

1990 albums
Cindytalk albums